Leo Thomas Nolan (10 December 1912 – 27 January 1979) was a New Zealand wrestler who represented his country at the 1938 British Empire Games.

Biography
Born on 10 December 1911, Nolan was the son of Thomas Nolan and Evelyn Beatrice Nolan (née Williams).

Representing Wellington, Nolan won several New Zealand amateur wrestling titles: he was the bantamweight champion in 1933, 1934, 1935, 1937 and 1938; the flyweight champion in 1935; and the lightweight champion in 1936.

At the 1938 British Empire Games in Sydney, Nolan competed in the freestyle wrestling bantamweight (57 kg) division. In the preliminary rounds, he defeated the Australian, Ted Purcell (who went on to win the gold medal), by one fall; but lost to Englishman Ray Cazaux (the eventual bronze medalist) by one fall. In the semi-finals, Nolan was defeated by the Canadian competitor, Vernon Blake, and finished in fourth place.

During World War II, Nolan served as a driver in the 2nd New Zealand Expeditionary Force.

Nolan died on 27 January 1979, and he was buried at Paraparaumu Cemetery.

References

1911 births
1979 deaths
Commonwealth Games competitors for New Zealand
Wrestlers at the 1938 British Empire Games
New Zealand male sport wrestlers
New Zealand military personnel of World War II
Burials at Paraparaumu Cemetery